The Bingley Arms is a public house in Bardsey, Leeds, West Yorkshire, England. It claims to be both the oldest surviving business and oldest surviving pub in the United Kingdom. It is possibly the fourth oldest surviving business in Europe.

Founding and history
The Bingley Arms was originally named The Priests Inn. The Bingley Arms calls itself the oldest pub in Britain, with a history dating back to between AD 905 and AD 953, and says that it served as a safe house for persecuted Catholic priests, and also as a courthouse from around AD 1000 from which offenders were taken to the pillory across the road. The Bingley Arms was featured in a 2005 book review discussion on the invention of traditional public house history, "Great Pub Myths", and "claims to be... the oldest pub in Britain", published in the Yorkshire Evening Post.

The Bingley Arms is also a restaurant, and a former winner of the Yorkshire Evening Post Restaurant of the Year Award. The Automobile Association states it provides "charm" and "excellent food".

The beer garden is home to a yew tree that pre-dates the Bingley Arms.

See also
 Listed buildings in Bardsey cum Rigton
 List of oldest companies

Notes

External links

 Official website

Pubs in Leeds
10th-century establishments in England
English brands